William Helmer Bakke (born November 20, 1946 in Menomonie, Wisconsin) is an American former ski jumper who competed in the 1968 Winter Olympics.

References

1946 births
Living people
American male ski jumpers
People from Menomonie, Wisconsin
Olympic ski jumpers of the United States
Ski jumpers at the 1968 Winter Olympics
Place of birth missing (living people)